Maria Teresa Ferrer i Mallol (25 August 1940 – 4 March 2017) was a Spanish medieval historian, who worked at the  and Institut d'Estudis Catalans.

Early life and education
Maria Teresa Ferrer i Mallol was born in Barcelona on 25 August 1940. Ferrer i Mallol received a degree in philosophy in 1963 from the University of Barcelona, and completed a PhD from the same institution in 1984.

Academic focus
Ferrer i Mallol's academic career spanned from 1963 to 2011. Her work focused upon Catalonia in the 14th and 15th centuries, particularly economic and merchant trading in those periods. She believed that the Mudéjar Muslim, Jewish and Christian communities living in Catalonia and Valencia in the 14th century managed to co-exist due to religious segregation. She believed this segregation and discrimination was forced upon the Mudéjar community.

Career
From 1981–1984, she also worked on the Gran Enciclopèdia Catalana for the Generalitat de Catalunya.  was her understudy at the IMF between 1985 and 1994. In 1991, fellow Catalan medieval historian  gave Ferrer i Mallol his last work, so that she could publish it for him posthumously. From 1992 until 2014, she was a member of the historical and archaeological department of the Institut d'Estudis Catalans (IEC). She was the secretary of the IEC from 1995–2001, then the vice-president from 2001–2006, and was president from 2006–2014.

In 1993, she became a member of the Spanish Society of Medieval Studies. In 2002, she became Professor of Research at the IMF. 

After her retirement in 2011, the IMF honoured Ferrer i Mallol by producing the work La Corona catalanoaragonesa, l'Islam i el món mediterrani. Estudis d'història medieval en homenatge a la doctora Maria Teresa Ferrer i Mallol (The Catalan-Aragonese Crown, Islam and the Mediterranean world. Studies of medieval history in homage to Dr. Maria Teresa Ferrer i Mallol).

Death and legacy
Ferrer i Mallol died in 2017. Speaking after her death, Josep Massot i Muntaner, current president of the historical and archaeological department of the IEC, said that Ferrer i Mallol was "a great historian, very valuable and hardworking, which has left an important intellectual legacy in the institution, to which we will give continuity". In 2017, she was posthumously awarded the Ferren Soldevilla Prize for her work in medieval history.

Works
Sáez, Emilio, Ferrer i Mallol, Maria Teresa, Trenchs i Odena, Josep, Sáinz de la Maza Lasoli,Diplomatario del Cardenal Gil de Albornoz (Diplomate of Cardinal Gil de Albornoz), Regina, 1976-1995, 
García i Sanz, Amb Arcadi, Ferrer i Mallol, Maria Teresa, Assegurances i canvis marítims medievals a Barcelona (Medieval shipping and maritime changes in Barcelona), 1983, 
Els sarraïns de la Corona catalanoaragonesa en el segle XIV. Segregació i discriminació (The Saracens of the Catalan-Aragonese Crown in the 14th century. Segregation and discrimination), 1987, 
La frontera amb l'Islam en el segle XIV. Cristians i sarraïns al País Valencià (The border with Islam in the 14th century. Christians and Saracens in the Valencian Country), 1988, 
Organització i defensa d'un territori fronterer. La governació d'Oriola en el segle XIV (Organisation and defence of a border territory. The government of Orihuela in the 14th century), 1990, 
Corsarios castellanos y vascos en el Mediterráneo medieval (Castilian and Basque corsairs in the Medieval Mediterranean), 2000, 
Entre la paz y la guerra. La Corona Catalano-aragonesa y Castilla en la Baja Edad Media (Between peace and war. The Catalan-Aragonese Crown and Castles in the Late Middle Ages), 2005, 
Fuentes documentales para el estudio de los mudéjares (Documentary sources for the study of the Mudejars), 2005,

References

1940 births
2017 deaths
Writers from Barcelona
Historians from Catalonia
20th-century Spanish historians
Spanish women historians
Spanish medievalists
University of Barcelona alumni
Members of the Institute for Catalan Studies
21st-century Spanish historians